Bridge and Tunnel is a 2021 American comedy drama television series written, directed and produced by Edward Burns for Epix. The first season consists of 6 episodes and premiered on January 24, 2021. In July 2021, the series was renewed for a second season. In September 2022, the series was canceled after two seasons.

Premise
Set in the early 1980s in the working class of Long Island, New York, six childhood friends have just graduated college and are stepping out into the real world while also trying to hang on to the familiarity of their hometown and remaining years of their youth

Cast
 Sam Vartholomeos as Jimmy Farrell
 Caitlin Stasey as Jill Shore
 Gigi Zumbado as Tammy Ocampo
 JanLuis Castellanos as Mikey Diaz
 Brian Muller as Nick 'Pags' Pagnetti
 Edward Burns as Artie Farrell
Isabella Farrell as Stacey Ross
Erica Hernandez as Genie Farrell
 Barrett Wilbert Weed as Lizzie Pagnetti

Episodes

Series Overview

Season 1 (2021)

Season 2 (2022)

Production

Development
On October 15, 2020, it was announced that Epix had given the production (originally titled Gibson Station) a series order for a first season consisting of six episodes. The series premiere on January 24, 2021. On July 14, 2021, Epix renewed the series for a second season.
On September 28, 2022, Epix canceled the series after two seasons.

Casting
In October 2020 it was announced that the ensemble cast would include Sam Vartholomeos, Caitlin Stasey, Gigi Zumbado, JanLuis Castellanos, Brian Muller and Isabella Farrell. On December 2, 2020, Barrett Wilbert Weed joined the cast in a recurring role. On December 14, 2020, it was announced that Erica Hernandez had joined the cast in a recurring role.

Reception 
Writing for the AV Club, Danette Chavez gave the show a C rating, stating: "Bridge And Tunnel is stuck in neutral, hesitant to let its characters let go of a past that hardly seems worth revisiting."

The show holds a 29% on Rotten Tomatoes and a 52% on Metacritic, indicating mixed or average reviews.

References

External links
 
 

2020s American comedy-drama television series
2021 American television series debuts
2022 American television series endings
English-language television shows
MGM+ original programming
Television series set in the 1980s
Television series by MGM Television
Television shows set in Manhattan